The Czech Republic motorcycle Grand Prix was a motorcycling event that was part of the Grand Prix motorcycle racing season.  Before 1993, the race was known as the Czechoslovak motorcycle Grand Prix. Since 1965, the race was a part of world Grand Prix series (between 1982 and 1987 race was held as a part of European Grand Prix series only).

Since 1987 the race was held on the newly built Brno Circuit, the historical track led through the streets of western parts of Brno and neighboring villages, such as Bosonohy and Žebětín. It was the most prestigious motor race in the country. Brno has also held the most motorcycle championship rounds in the sport's history after the TT Circuit Assen.

The race was not included in the  calendar after Brno city councillors announced that they would opt out for the season, citing financial difficulties due to the COVID-19 pandemic.

Official names and sponsors

1965–1966, 1970–1971: Velká Cena ČSSR (no official sponsor)
1968–1969: Velká Cena Ceskoslovenska (no official sponsor)
1972–1982: Grand Prix ČSSR (no official sponsor)
1987: Grand Prix ČSSR Brno (no official sponsor)
1988–1989: Grand Prix ČSSR-Brno (no official sponsor)
1990: Grand Prix ČSFR Brno (no official sponsor)
1991: Grand Prix ČSFR-Brno (no official sponsor)
1993–1999: Grand Prix České Republiky (no official sponsor)
2000–2006: Gauloises Grand Prix České republiky
2007, 2011: Cardion AB Grand Prix České republiky
2008–2010: Cardion ab Grand Prix České republiky
2012–2015: bwin Grand Prix České republiky
2016: HJC Helmets Grand Prix České republiky
2017–2020: Monster Energy Grand Prix České republiky

Winners

Multiple winners (riders)

Multiple winners (manufacturers)

Winners of the Czech Republic motorcycle Grand Prix

Winners of the Czechoslovak motorcycle Grand Prix

A pink background indicates an event that was not part of the Grand Prix motorcycle racing championship.

References

 
Motorsport competitions in the Czech Republic
Recurring sporting events established in 1947
1947 establishments in Czechoslovakia
Recurring sporting events disestablished in 2020
2020 disestablishments in the Czech Republic